Star Awards 2016 (also SA2016, Chinese: 红星大奖2016) is a double television award ceremony which is held in Singapore. It is part of the annual Star Awards organised by Mediacorp for free-to-air channels Channels 8 and U.

This was the first Star Awards ceremony to be held on the new campus at Stars Avenue after its relocation happened in December 2015; for the first time since 2009, the technical awards were not broadcast on television.

The nominations were announced were announced on 1 February 2016 and the Most Favorite Artistes on 3 March 2016 at Mandarin Orchard Singapore, with the results announced during the ceremonies on 17 and 24 April 2016; for the first time in the ceremony's history, both shows placed emphasis for variety and drama programs, and the Top 10 Most Favorite Artists were separately awarded, respectively.

The ceremony saw the first season of GeTai Challenge and The Dream Makers II, became the biggest winners of the respective ceremonies, with the records set and streaks broken. Notably, The Dream Makers II made unprecedented records during the ceremony, notably becoming the second drama in history to win to earn such distinction on winning all five major acting categories (the first drama to achieve was Holland V in 2003).

Programme details

Backstage achievement awards (红星大奖2016之幕后英雄颁奖礼)
These technical awards were presented in Mandarin Orchard Singapore on 21 March 2016, and snippets of it were shown on the third episode of the prelude on 15 April 2016.

Winners are listed first, highlighted in boldface.

Show 1 (上半场)

Special Awards

All-Time Favourite Artistes
This award is a special achievement award given out to artiste(s) who have achieved a maximum of 10 popularity awards over 10 years. Top 10 winning years the recipients were awarded together are highlighted in boldface.

Top 10 Most Popular Female Artistes
The Top 10 Most Popular Female Artistes are decided by telepoll and online voting, which carries a 50% weightage of the combined total score each. The telepoll lines were announced on 3 March 2015 in a press conference at Mandarin Orchard Singapore, along with the Top 10 Most Popular Male Artistes. Voting for the Female Artistes opened from 4 March, and ended at 8:30 pm on 17 April.

The nominees are listed in telepoll line order. The results of the Top 10 awards are not in any rank order.

Show 2 (下半场)
The nominees and representative titles are listed in alphabetical name order, unless otherwise stated. Winners are listed first, highlighted in boldface.

A representative collected the award in place of the nominee.

Special Awards

Top 10 Most Popular Male Artistes
Like the Top 10 Most Popular Female Artistes, the Top 10 Most Popular Male Artistes are decided by telepoll and online voting. Voting for the Male Artistes opened from 4 March, and ended at 8:30 pm on 24 April.

The nominees are listed in telepoll line order. The results of the Top 10 awards are not in any rank order.

Post Show Party (红星大奖2016庆功宴)

A representative collected the award in place of the nominee. 
Rui En was unable to collect the award as she left the venue after the award ceremony due to her gastric problem.

Summary of nominations and awards (by programme genre)

Most nominations
Programs that received multiple nominations are listed below, by number of nominations per work:

Most wins

Presenters and performers
The following individuals presented awards or performed musical numbers.

Show 1

Presenters

Performers

Show 2

Presenters

Performers

Video snippets
In commemoration of the first Star Awards ceremony held in the new MediaCorp campus, nomination videos shown for show 2 begin with a short 15-second snippet of a performer playing an instrument which was shot either at the Gardens by the Bay (first five listed) or at the new MediaCorp campus.

Ceremony Information

Awards categories
This is the first ceremony to introduce three awards, "Best Programme Host", "Best Evergreen Artiste" and the voting category "Bioskin Flawless Skin Award". The Best Programme Host was a combination of both Best Variety Show Host and Best Info-Ed Programme Host awards as both categories have a similar presentation structure.
This is the first year all five nominations for the Best Drama Serial have the same nominations for the Best Theme Song. Coincidentally, the winning Drama Serial The Dream Makers II also won the Best Theme Song.
This was the final ceremony the online Favourite award categories were held.
Jeanette Aw was nominated again for Favourite Female Character and Favourite Onscreen Couple (Drama). Initially, Aw stated that she expressed her intention to remove her name from the nominations due to her winning six voting-based awards (which include Most Popular Regional Artiste Awards, Social Media Award and Favourite Female Character award for her role in The Journey: Tumultuous Times), but Mediacorp declined her request as the awards were determined though online voting, and still requiring her to participate. 
This was the first (and to date, currently the only) ceremony in which the awards for the Top 10 Artistes were presented in separate shows instead of single show, with the female artistes awarded in show 1, and the male artistes on show 2.
It was also the first (and to date the only) ceremony the main awards were split into two shows, each focusing on Variety/Info-ed and Drama, respectively.
Due to none of the artiste won their ninth Top 10 Popular Artiste title at the time after the ceremony, 2018 was thus became the third ceremony, after 2007 and 2013, to not present the All-Time Favourite Artiste since its category inception in 2004.

Nomination firsts
First-time nominees included Bonnie Loo, Edwin Goh, Ian Fang, Romeo Tan, Sheila Sim, Jeffrey Xu and Ya Hui for the Top 10 awards.
Aileen Tan, Chen Tianwen, Jesseca Liu, Pan Lingling, Kate Pang, Zhang Yaodong and Zhang Zhenhuan were nominated for the Top 10 awards after not nominated for the category last year.
Chen Tianwen was nominated for the Top 10 Most Popular Male Artiste award for the first time since 2002, marking the longest absence by any returning artiste so far at 13 years.
Liu was nominated for the Top 10 Most Popular Male Artiste award for the first time since 2010. Between 2010 and 2015, she left Mediacorp to join HIM International Music due to the contract expiry, but later returned to Mediacorp last year after she recently signed a new acting contract.

Consecutive and records in award categories, first in Top 10
The Dream Makers II set numerous records during the night's ceremony:
The series set the largest count of nominations for a ceremony in a single year with 26, surpassing the first series's 21 from the 2014 ceremony.
The series also set a record on winning the most awards for a ceremony in a single year with 12, surpassing both the first series and The Little Nyonya, both with nine wins.
The series became the first drama to win every awards they were nominated for, except for Favorite Male Artiste (which was not nominated) and Top Rated Drama Series (all the dramas were eligible).
The series became the ninth drama to have its series nominated for the Best Drama Serial multiple times, and the first (and to date, the only) drama to win in this category twice.
The series became the second drama to earn the distinction in which the drama won all five major acting categories (which were Best Drama Serial, Best Actor and Actress, and Best Supporting Actor and Actress), with the first being 2003's drama Holland V.
Jayley Woo, Aloysius Pang and Jeffrey Xu won the Top 10 awards for the first time, alongside Jesseca Liu, Dennis Chew, Zhang Yaodong, Zhang Zhenhuan and Zheng Geping, who neither were nominated nor won last year.
Elvin Ng became the eighth All-Time Favourite Artiste to win the award with ten consecutive Top 10 Male Favourite Artiste wins. Ng, along with Joanne Peh and Quan Yi Fong, were conferred the said award in the following year's ceremony.
For the first time since 2010, Star Awards ended a five-consecutive winning streak for the Best Variety Special category, losing to the first season of GeTai Challenge.

Other trivia
Part 1, Part 2 and Post-Show Party are the second, third and fourth 'live' variety specials in Mandarin respectively to be held at the Theatre@Mediacorp, after Lions Charity Show 2016.
Despite being the two-part program, this was the first ceremony since 2009 the Backstage Awards were presented outside the award ceremony. This was also the last ceremony to host a two-part ceremony since its format was revamped in 2010.

Controversy
Professional and programme awards will only be given out when there are at least 10 candidates from 2014 onwards. Even though Channel 8 News & Current Affairs already had at least ten news presenters by the end of 2015, the Best News Presenter award, which was suspended along with the Best Current Affairs Presenter award, were still absent for the third consecutive ceremony.
The Best Newcomer award was also suspended due to the lack of candidates, but it will return again in the 2018 ceremony, two years later.

Star Awards 2017 nominations
Both ceremonies and the Walk-of-fame were nominated for Best Variety Special in the ceremony next year, and the second show clinched it; it was Star Awards seventh win for the award.

See also
 List of programmes broadcast by MediaCorp Channel 8
 Mediacorp Channel 8
 Star Awards

References

Star Awards